The Jetour X70 is a series of 7-seater mid-size crossover produced by Jetour, a brand launched in 2018 by Chery under Chery Commercial Vehicle.

There are several variants including the  Jetour X70S, Jetour X70S EV, Jetour X70 Coupe, Jetour X70M, and the range topping Jetour X70 Plus model that serves as a more upmarket model.

Jetour X70 (first generation)

The Jetour X70 comes in two models, including the base and  S trim. The Jetour X70S is a more upmarket and luxurious trim level with different alloys and grille insert. Prices of the Jetour X70 ranges from 69,900 yuan to 120,900 yuan.

The model comes with a 10.1-inch infotainment display, start button, keyless access, 360-degree vision system, power seat with parking sensor, independent climate control, sunroof, LED headlights, front and rear active cruise control, gate automatic rear, etc.

The powertrain of the vehicle comes with a 1.5-litre turbocharged petrol engine with  output and 8-speed automatic gearbox and 5-speed manual gearboxes.

2019 facelift

The Jetour X70 2019 facelift was officially launched on 27 August with price ranging from 69,900 to 120,900 yuan (~US$9,764 – US$16,888) across the 9 trim levels offered.

The Jetour X70 facelift is powered by 1.5-litre turbocharged engine producing  and peak torque of  mated to a 6-manual transmission and 6-speed dual clutch transmission. The engine will meet the updated national VI emission standards.

Jetour X70 Coupe

The Jetour X70 Coupe was unveiled at the 2018 Beijing Auto Show as a sportier variant of the X70. During the 2019 Shanghai Auto Show, the appearance of the production version has changed significantly. The design of the Jetour X70 Coupe is based on the Jetour X70 2019 facelift while featuring an integrated body-colored grille frame. Pre-sale price range of the X70 Coupe is 91,000 to 129,000 yuan (~US$13,119 – US$18,597) in the Chinese market. The Jetour X70 Coupe is powered by three power combinations, a 1.5-litre turbo engine mated to a 6-speed manual gearbox or 6-speed DCT and a 1.6-litre turbo engine mated to a 7-speed DCT.

Jetour X70M
The Jetour X70M was launched in March 2020 as a more affordable variant of the X70 model range. According to officials, the "M" means "Mate", indicating the model being an affordable and volume-focused variant. The X70M is based on the pre-facelift X70 with a redesigned and more updated front bumper design. Price range of the X70M is 64,900 to 89,900 yuan.

Jetour X70S EV
Jetour debuted the Jetour X70S EV as its first all electric crossover model on the 2019 Shanghai Auto Show. As the name suggests, the X70S EV is based on the pre-facelift Jetour X70S and is the first new energy model from Jetour's production line, the exterior design and interior is essentially the same design of the Jetour X70S.

The electronic gear lever on the Jetour X70S is replaced by technical looking electronic shift lever for the X70S EV, with the shift lever is equipped with functional buttons.

At the 2020 Guangzhou Auto Show, Jetour unveiled a facelift for the X70S EV featuring a design exclusively for the electric model.

MASTA EV
The South Korean specification of X70S and it was independently designed by MASTA EV, the South Korean EV manufacturer. The model were first revealed in 2021 Seoul Mobility Show and their first SUV will be launch in October 2022.

Second generation (X70 Plus)

The Jetour X70 Plus is a slightly larger and more upmarket variant of the X70 based on the same platform while featuring a redesign front and rear. The Jetour X70 Plus debuted during the 2020 Beijing International Auto Show that officially started on 26 September 2020. From the exterior, the Jetour X70 Plus is longer and taller than the regular X70, and offers 5-seater, 6-seater, and 7-seater models.

For the interior, the X70 Plus features a 10.25-inch full LCD smart dual screen and air conditioning controls are integrated in a touch panel.

The Jetour X70 Plus is powered by a 1.5-litre turbo engine with a maximum output of  mated to a 6-speed manual gearbox or 6-speed DCT and a 1.6-litre turbo engine with a maximum output of  mated to a 7-speed DCT which is the same as the Jetour X70 Coupe.

Worldwide Launch 
The Jetour X70 Plus has made a successful launch in several countries including the United Arab Emirates, Oman, Ecuador, Qatar, Saudi Arabia, Myanmar, Chile, and Paraguay. This new vehicle has been well received by consumers and is generating a great deal of interest among car enthusiasts. The Jetour X70 Plus offers advanced features and cutting-edge technology, making it a standout choice in the crowded automotive market. Its sleek design, powerful engine, and spacious interior make it a top pick for families and individuals alike. With its widespread availability in these countries, the Jetour X70 Plus is poised to make a significant impact in the automotive industry.

References
https://jetouruae.com/tips-to-maintain-jetour-cars-during-uaes-summer-heat/

External links
X70 (Chinese)
X70S (Chinese)
New X70S (Chinese)
X70 Coupe (Chinese)
X70M (Chinese)
X70 PLUS (Chinese)
X70 Zhuge (Chinese)

Mid-size sport utility vehicles
Crossover sport utility vehicles
Cars introduced in 2018
Cars of China
Production electric cars